The 2022 African Women's Handball Championship was the 25th edition of the African Women's Handball Championship, which took place from 9 to 19 November 2022, in Dakar, Senegal. The tournament was held under the aegis of African Handball Confederation and acted as the African qualifying tournament for the 2023 World Women's Handball Championship, with the top four teams qualifying.

Angola won their 15th title after defeating Cameroon in the final.

Draw
The draw took place on 28 September 2022 in Dakar, Senegal.

Preliminary round
All times are local (UTC±0).

Group A

Group B

Group C

Ranking of third-placed teams
In Group B, the result against the last-placed team was omitted.

Presidents Cup

9–13th place semifinals

Round-robin

Bracket

Eleventh place game

Ninth place game

Knockout stage

Bracket

5–8th place bracket

Quarterfinals

5–8th place semifinals

Semifinals

Seventh place game

Fifth place game

Third place game

Final

Final standing

All-Star team
The All-star team was announced on 21 November 2022.

References

2022
2022 in women's handball
Sports competitions in Dakar
International sports competitions hosted by Senegal
November 2022 sports events in Africa
2022 in African women's sport